Old and Lost Rivers is a short orchestral composition by the American composer Tobias Picker.  

The work was commissioned to commemorate the sesquicentenary of Texas by the Houston Symphony, for which Picker had recently been appointed composer-in-residence.  The work was composed in the spring of 1986 and was given its world premiere by the Houston Symphony under the conductor Sergiu Comissiona in Jones Hall, Houston on May 9, 1986.  Later that year, Picker adapted the work for solo piano as a birthday present for the pianist Ursula Oppens; this rendition of the work was premiered by Oppens at Carnegie Hall in March 1987.  

The piece is dedicated to Stephen M. Aechternacht and is one of Picker's most frequently performed compositions.

Composition
Old and Lost Rivers is composed in a single movement and has a duration of roughly six minutes.  Picker described the inspiration for the piece in the score program notes, writing: Heading west, the sign reads "Lost and Old River", as the Lost River is crossed first.

Instrumentation
The work is scored for a large orchestra comprising three flutes (doubling piccolo), two oboes, three clarinets (doubling bass clarinet), three bassoons, six horns, three trumpets, tuba, timpani, percussion, harp, piano, and strings.

Reception
Old and Lost Rivers has been praised by music critics.  John von Rhein of the Chicago Tribune described it as "a tranquil meditation that suggests Copland in his lyrical-pastoral vein."  Andrew Achenbach described the piece as "wonderful" and called it "a haunting miniature, full of a sultry nostalgia which seems to distil the very essence of America's Deep South."

Recordings
The orchestral version of Old and Lost Rivers has twice been commercially recorded.  The first recording was performed by the Houston Symphony under the conductor Christoph Eschenbach and released through Virgin Classics in 1991.  The second recording was performed by the London Symphony Orchestra under John Williams and  released through Sony BMG in 1997.

References

Compositions by Tobias Picker
1986 compositions
Compositions for symphony orchestra
Music commissioned by the Houston Symphony